Osvaldoginella is a genus of sea snails, marine gastropod mollusks in the family Cystiscidae.

Species
Species within the genus Osvaldoginella include:
 Osvaldoginella acualina Espinosa & Ortea, 2018
 Osvaldoginella alejandrae Espinosa & Ortea, 2014
 Osvaldoginella cabera Espinosa & Ortea, 2018
 Osvaldoginella celisi Espinosa & Ortea, 2018
 Osvaldoginella columba Espinosa & Ortea, 2018
 Osvaldoginella fluctuata (McCleery & Wakefield, 2007)
 Osvaldoginella gomezi Espinosa & Ortea, 1997
 Osvaldoginella hoffi (Moolenbeek & Faber, 1991)
 Osvaldoginella jaguaella Espinosa & Ortea, 2018
 Osvaldoginella ornata (McCleery & Wakefield, 2007)
 Osvaldoginella phantasia (McCleery & Wakefield, 2007)

References